Killagan railway station served the villages of Bellaghy and Killagan in County Antrim, Northern Ireland.

History

The station was opened as Bellaghy by the Ballymena, Ballymoney, Coleraine and Portrush Junction Railway on 4 December 1855. It was taken over by the Northern Counties Committee in January 1861.

It was renamed Killagan on 1 January 1876.

The signal box at Killagan was destroyed in 1921 and again in 1957 during periods of civil disturbance.

The station closed to passengers on 2 July 1973.

References 

Disused railway stations in County Antrim
Railway stations opened in 1855
Railway stations closed in 1973
1855 establishments in Ireland
1973 disestablishments in Northern Ireland
Railway stations in Northern Ireland opened in the 19th century